Miss Earth Belgium is a title given to a woman who is selected to represent Belgium at Miss Earth, an annual international beauty pageant promoting environmental awareness. The national pageant of Miss Earth for Belgium is conducted by Miss Exclusive to which Carousel Productions, the owner of Miss Earth, awarded the franchise in 2014. The winner of Miss Exclusive gets the title of Miss Earth Belgium.

The current titleholder is Daphné Nivelles who was crowned on 7th May 2022 and finished as part of the Top 8 semifinalists in Miss Earth 2022.

In Miss Earth 2021, Selena Ali represented her country and placed in the Top 20. She is the first-ever Belgian to be placed as a finalist in Miss Earth history, ending a 19-year drought for Belgium since joining Miss Earth in 2002.

History

2002-2013: Early years
Belgium debuted in Miss Earth in 2002 and the franchise was under the Miss Benelux contest until 2011. Miss Belgium International acquired the franchise from 2011 until 2013.

2014-present: Miss Exclusive
Miss Exclusive acquired the franchise of Miss Earth and is considered to be the biggest pageant across Belgium. It was created in 2009 and the main winner gets to compete in Miss Earth, an annual international beauty pageant promoting environmental awareness. The pageant is under the directorship of Remi Esquelisse and Ken Stevens. Miss Earth is part of the Big Four international beauty pageants.

Traditionally, the winner of Miss Exclusive gets the title of Miss Earth Belgium and competes in the international Miss Earth pageant. The first winner of Miss Exclusive for Miss Earth is Emily Vanhoutte. In Miss Earth 2022 edition, Daphné Nivelles represented her country and managed to enter into the Top 8 finalist. It was the highest and second consecutive placement for a Belgian candidate in the pageant history.

Titleholders
The winner of Miss Exclusive gets the title of Miss Earth Belgium and competes in the international Miss Earth pageant.

See also 
 Miss Belgium
 Miss International Belgium

References

External links
Miss Earth Official Website

Belgium
Beauty pageants in Belgium
Recurring events established in 2010
2010 establishments in Belgium
Belgian awards